The following is an outline of topics related to the Republic of Bolivia.

Bolivia
 Bolivia
 Environmental issues in Bolivia
 Foreign aid to Bolivia
ISO 3166-1 alpha-2 country code for Bolivia: BO
ISO 3166-1 alpha-3 country code for Bolivia: BOL
ISO 3166-2:BO region codes for Bolivia
 Tupac Katari Guerrilla Army

Buildings and structures in Bolivia
 Basilica of Our Lady of Copacabana
 Palacio Quemado

Airports in Bolivia
 List of airports in Bolivia
 La Paz / El Alto: El Alto International Airport
 Cochabamba: Jorge Wilstermann International Airport
 Sucre: Juana Azurduy de Padilla International Airport
 Santa Cruz: Viru Viru International Airport
 Santa Cruz: El Trompillo Airport

Archaeological sites in Bolivia
 Chiripa
 El Fuerte de Samaipata
 Incallajta
 Oroncota
 Tiwanaku

Astronomical observatories in Bolivia
 Chacaltaya
 Tarija

Sports venues in Bolivia

Football venues in Bolivia
 Estadio Félix Capriles
 Estadio Hernando Siles
 Estadio IV Centenário
 Estadio Jesús Bermúdez
 Estadio Libertador Simón Bolivar
 Estadio Mario Mercado Vaca Guzmán
 Estadio Olímpico Patria
 Estadio Rafael Mendoza
 Estadio Ramón Tahuichi Aguilera

Cities in Bolivia
 List of cities in Bolivia
 Achacachi
 Arani (Bolivia)
 Arque
 Camiri
 Capinota
 Caranavi
 Cobija
 Cochabamba
 Copacabana, Bolivia
 Coroico
 El Alto
 Inquisivi
 La Higuera
 La Paz
 Mizque
 Montero
 Orinoca
 Oruro, Bolivia
 Potosí
 Presto, Bolivia
 Puerto Suárez
 Punata
 Quillacollo
 Riberalta
 Sacaba
 Santa Cruz de la Sierra
 Sucre
 Tapacarí
 Tarija, Bolivia
 Tiraque
 Torotoro (Bolivia)
 Trinidad, Bolivia
 Tupiza
 Uyuni
 Vallegrande
 Villa Tunari
 Villamontes

Communications in Bolivia
 Communications in Bolivia
 .bo Internet country code top-level domain for Bolivia
 List of people on stamps of Bolivia

Conservation in Bolivia
 Comunidad Inti Wara Yassi

National parks of Bolivia
 List of national parks of Bolivia
 Amboró National Park
 Madidi
 Noel Kempff Mercado National Park
 Torotoro National Park

World Heritage Sites in Bolivia
 Jesuit Missions of Chiquitos
 El Fuerte de Samaipata
 Noel Kempff Mercado National Park
 Potosí
 Sucre
 Template:World Heritage Sites in Bolivia
 Tiwanaku

Bolivian culture
 Culture of Bolivia
 Ayllus
 Carnaval de Oruro
 Coat of arms of Bolivia
 Ekeko
 Flag of Bolivia
 National Anthem of Bolivia
 Public holidays in Bolivia
 Tinku

Bolivian art

Bolivian artists
 Alfredo Da Silva
 Roberto Berdecio
 Graciela Rodo Boulanger
 Alejandra Dorado
 Ivar Mendez
 Nilo Soruco
 Francisco Tito Yupanqui

Bolivian cinema

Bolivian films
 List of Bolivian films

Bolivian film directors
 José Maria Velasco Maidana

Bolivian music
 Music of Bolivia
 Grupo Aymara
 Luzmila Carpio

Bolivian musical groups
 Khanata
 Los Jairas
 Los Kjarkas
 Paja Brava

Bolivian musicians
 Hernán Ergueta
 Emma Junaro
 Gladys Moreno
 Zulma Yugar

Bolivian cuisine
 Anticuchos
 Chuflay
 Guinea pig
 Locro
 Pique macho
 Salteñas
 Singani
 Silpancho
 Yungueño
 Green iguana
 Roasted duck

Languages of Bolivia
 Arawakan languages
 Ayacucho Quechua
 Aymara language
 Barbacoan languages
 Eastern Bolivian Guarani
 Guaraní language
 Itonama language
 Plautdietsch
 Puquina language
 Quechua
 Qusqu-Qullaw
 Saraveca
 South Bolivian Quechua
 Southern Quechua
 Spanish language

Bolivian literature

Bolivian writers
 Alcides Arguedas
 Yolanda Bedregal
 Javier del Granado
 Jaime Saenz
 Pedro Shimose
 Gastón Suárez
 Arturo von Vacano

Bolivian children's writers
 Ben Mikaelsen

Religion in Bolivia
 Religion in Bolivia
 Islam in Bolivia
 Roman Catholicism in Bolivia

Bolivian prelates

Bolivian bishops
 Archbishop Francisco Ramón Herboso y Figueroa

Bolivian cardinals
 Cardinal Julio Terrazas Sandoval

Roman Catholic Church in Bolivia

Economy of Bolivia
 Economy of Bolivia
 Bolivian boliviano

Companies of Bolivia
 YPFB

Ports and harbours of Bolivia
 Puerto Aguirre
 Puerto Quijarro
 Puerto Suárez

Tourism in Bolivia
 List of national parks of Bolivia
 Madidi

Trade unions of Bolivia
 Bolivian Workers' Center
 Confederación Sindical Única de Trabajadores Campesinos de Bolivia
 Corriente de Renovación Independiente y Solidaridad Laboral
 Federación Sindical de Trabajadores Mineros de Bolivia

Education in Bolivia
 Education in Bolivia
 List of universities in Bolivia

Schools in Bolivia
 American Cooperative School of La Paz
 American Educational Association
 Cochabamba Cooperative School
 ABC Spanish Tuition School, La Paz - Bolivia

Ethnic groups in Bolivia
 Aymara people
 Bororo people
 Guarani people
 Quechuas
 Tsimane' (aka Chimane)
 Yuracaré

Fauna of Bolivia
 Andean cat
 Andean cock-of-the-rock
 Andean condor
 Andean tinamou
 Argentine grey fox
 Bolivian squirrel
 Bothrops atrox
 Brown tinamou
 Buffy broad-nosed bat
 Bush dog
 Crab-eating fox
 Dark fruit-eating bat
 Elegant rice rat
 Geoffroy's cat
 Grey tinamou
 Hoffmann's two-toed sloth
 Jaguar
 Lachesis muta
 Maned wolf
 Margay
 Minor long-nosed long-tongued bat
 Pampas cat
 Pampas fox
 Paradise jacamar
 Paradise tanager
 Puff-legs
 Puna tinamou
 red-winged tinamou
 Sechura fox
 Short-eared dog
 Short-headed broad-nosed bat
 Variegated tinamou
 white-lined broad-nosed bat
 white-throated tinamou

Geography of Bolivia
 Geography of Bolivia
 Altiplano
 Amazon Basin
 El Mutún
 Incallajta
 Pantanal
 Salar de Uyuni
 Strait of Tiquina
 Yungas

Subdivisions of Bolivia
 ISO 3166-2:BO
 Atacama Department
 Municipalities of Bolivia
 Provinces of Bolivia
 Departments of Bolivia

Lakes of Bolivia
 Poopó Lake
 Lake Titicaca
 Laguna Verde, Bolivia

Maps of Bolivia
 Maps of Bolivia

Maps of the history of Bolivia
 Maps of Bolivia

Mountains of Bolivia
 Acotango
 Anallajsi
 Cabaray
 Chacaltaya
 Columa
 Cordillera Central, Bolivia
 Cordillera de Lípez
 Cordillera Real (Bolivia)
 Cordillera Occidental, Bolivia
 Cordillera Oriental, Bolivia
 Illampu
 Illimani
 Iru Phutunqu
 Licancabur
 Lípez
 Laram Q'awa
 Mururata
 Michincha
 Nuevo Mundo
 Olca
 Paquni
 Parina Quta
 Paruma
 Patilla Pata
 Pomerape
 Sacabaya
 Sajama
 Tata Sabaya
 Wayna Potosí

Rivers of Bolivia
 Abuna River
 Arque River
 Beni River
 Bermejo River
 Caine River
 Madeira River
 Madre de Dios River
 Mamoré
 Paraguay River
 Pilcomayo River
 Río Grande (Bolivia)
 Yacuma River

Ski areas and resorts in Bolivia
 Chacaltaya

Subdivisions of Bolivia
 Departments of Bolivia
 Provinces of Bolivia

Provinces of Bolivia
 Provinces of Bolivia
 Abel Iturralde Province
 Alonso de Ibáñez Province
 Aniceto Arce Province
 Antonio Quijarro Province
 Arani Province
 Aroma Province
 Arque Province
 Atahuallpa Province
 Ayopaya Province
 Bautista Saavedra Province
 Belisario Boeto Province
 Bernardino Bilbao Province
 Bolívar Province, Bolivia
 Burnet O'Connor Province
 Capinota Province
 Caranavi Province
 Carangas Province
 Carrasco Province (Bolivia)
 Cercado Province (Beni)
 Cercado Province (Cochabamba)
 Cercado Province (Oruro)
 Cercado Province (Tarija)
 Chapare Province
 Charcas Province
 Chayanta Province
 Chiquitos Province
 Cordillera Province (Bolivia)
 Cornelio Saavedra Province
 Daniel Campos Province
 Eduardo Avaroa Province
 Eliodoro Camacho Province
 Enrique Baldivieso Province
 Esteban Arce Province
 Eustaquio Méndez Province
 Florida Province
 Franz Tamayo Province
 Germán Busch Province
 Germán Jordán Province
 Gran Chaco Province
 Gualberto Villarroel Province
 Hernando Siles Province
 Ingavi Province
 Inquisivi Province
 Iténez Province
 Jaime Zudáñez Province
 José Ballivián Province
 José Manuel Pando Province
 José María Avilés Province
 José María Linares Province
 Juana Azurduy de Padilla Province
 Ladislao Cabrera Province
 Larecaja Province
 Litoral Province (Bolivia)
 Loayza Province
 Los Andes Province (Bolivia)
 Luis Calvo Province
 Mamoré Province
 Manco Kapac Province
 Marbán Province
 Mizque Province
 Modesto Omiste Province
 Moxos Province
 Muñecas Province
 Narciso Campero Province
 Nor Carangas Province
 Nor Chichas Province
 Nor Cinti Province
 Nor Lípez Province
 Nor Yungas Province
 Omasuyos Province
 Oropeza Province
 Pacajes Province
 Pantaléon Dalence Province
 Pedro Domingo Murillo Province
 Poopó Province
 Puerto de Mejillones Province
 Punata Province
 Quillacollo Province
 Rafael Bustillo Province
 Sajama Province
 San Pedro de Totora Province
 Sara Province
 Saucarí Province
 Sebastián Pagador Province
 Sud Carangas Province
 Sud Chichas Province
 Sud Cinti Province
 Sud Lípez Province
 Sud Yungas Province
 Tapacarí Province
 Tiraque Province
 Tomas Barrón Province
 Tomina Province
 Tomás Frías Province
 Vaca Diéz Province
 Vallegrande Province
 Yacuma Province
 Yamparáez Province

Volcanoes of Bolivia
 Acotango
 Nevado Anallajsi
 Cabaray
 Cerro Columa
 Irruputuncu
 Licancabur
 Cerro Lípez
 Macizo de Larancagua
 Macizo de Pacuni
 Cerro Minchincha
 Nevadoes de Quimsachata
 Nuevo Mundo volcano
 Olca
 Parinacota Volcano
 Paruma
 Patilla Pata
 Pomerape
 Sacabaya
 Nevado Sajama
 Tata Sabaya

Natural Disasters of Bolivia
 1994 Bolivia earthquake

Bolivia geography stubs
 Abel Iturralde Province
 Abuna River
 Alonso de Ibáñez Province
 Amboró National Park
 Aniceto Arce Province
 Antonio Quijarro Province
 Apolo, La Paz
 Arani (Bolivia)
 Arani Province
 Aroma Province
 Arque
 Arque Province
 Atacama Department
 Atahuallpa Province
 Ayopaya
 Ayopaya Province
 Lake Ballivián
 Bautista Saavedra Province
 Belisario Boeto Province
 Beni River
 Bernardino Bilbao Province
 Bolívar Province (Bolivia)
 Burnet O'Connor Province
 Caine River
 Capinota Province
 Caranavi
 Carangas Province
 Carrasco Province (Bolivia)
 Catavi
 Cercado Province (Beni)
 Cercado Province (Cochabamba)
 Cercado Province (Oruro)
 Cercado Province (Tarija)
 Cerro Columa
 Cerro Lípez
 Chalalan
 Chapare Province
 Charcas Province
 Chayanta Province
 Chiquitos Province
 Chulumani
 Chuquiago
 Chuquisaca Department
 Cobija
 Cochabamba Department
 Copacabana, Bolivia
 Cordillera Occidental, Bolivia
 Cordillera Oriental, Bolivia
 Cordillera Province (Bolivia)
 Cordillera Real (Bolivia)
 Cordillera de Lípez
 Cornelio Saavedra Province
 Coroico
 Daniel Campos Province
 Eduardo Avaroa Province
 El Alto
 El Fuerte de Samaipata
 Eliodoro Camacho Province
 Enrique Baldivieso Province
 Esteban Arce Province
 Eustaquio Méndez Province
 Florida Province
 Franz Tamayo Province
 Germán Busch Province
 Germán Jordán Province
 Gran Chaco Province
 Gualberto Villarroel Province
 Hernando Siles Province
 Huayna Potosí
 Ingavi Province
 Inquisivi
 Inquisivi Province
 Isla del Sol
 Iténez Province
 Jaime Zudáñez Province
 José Ballivián Province
 José Manuel Pando Province
 José María Avilés Province
 José María Linares Province
 Juana Azurduy de Padilla Province
 La Plata Basin
 Ladislao Cabrera Province
 Laguna Verde, Bolivia
 Larecaja Province
 Licancabur
 Litoral Province (Bolivia)
 Loayza Province
 Los Andes Province (Bolivia)
 Luis Calvo Province
 Madidi
 Mamoré Province
 Manco Kapac Province
 Marbán Province
 Mizque
 Mizque Province
 Modesto Omiste Province
 Montero
 Mount Copaja
 Moxos savanna
 Moxos Province
 Muela del diablo
 Muñecas Province
 Narciso Campero Province
 Nevado Anallajsi
 Nevado Sajama
 Nor Carangas Province
 Nor Chichas Province
 Nor Cinti Province
 Nor Lípez Province
 Nor Yungas Province
 Omasuyos Province
 Oropeza Province
 Oruro Department
 Oruro, Bolivia
 Pacajes Province
 Palacio Quemado
 Patacamaya
 Pampagrande
 Pando Department
 Pantaléon Dalence Province
 Parinacota Province
 Pedro Domingo Murillo Province
 Pomerape
 Poopó Province
 Poopó Province
 Presto, Bolivia
 Provinces of Bolivia
 Puerto Aguirre
 Puerto Busch
 Puerto Quijarro
 Puerto Suárez
 Puerto de Mejillones Province
 Punata
 Punata Province
 Quillacollo
 Quillacollo Province
 Rafael Bustillo Province
 Riberalta
 Rurrenabaque
 Sajama Province
 Samaipata, Bolivia
 San Pedro de Totora Province
 Sara Province
 Saucarí Province
 Sebastián Pagador Province
 Siglo XX
 Sorata
 Strait of Tiquina
 Sucre
 Sud Carangas Province
 Sud Chichas Province
 Sud Cinti Province
 Sud Lípez Province
 Sud Yungas Province
 Tapacarí
 Tapacarí Province
 Tarija, Bolivia
 Template:Bolivia-geo-stub
 Tiraque
 Tiraque Province
 Tomas Barrón Province
 Tomina Province
 Tomás Frías Province
 Tupiza
 Uyuni
 Vaca Diéz Province
 Vallegrande
 Vallegrande Province
 Viacha
 Villa Tunari
 Villamontes
 Yacuma Province
 Yacuma River
 Yamparáez Province
 Yungas

Government of Bolivia
 Foreign relations of Bolivia
 National Congress of Bolivia
 Palacio Quemado

Presidents of Bolivia
 President of Bolivia
 José María Achá
 Aniceto Arce
 Mariano Baptista
 Adolfo Ballivián
 Hugo Ballivián
 Hugo Banzer
 René Barrientos
 Manuel Isidoro Belzu
 Carlos Blanco Galindo
 Simón Bolívar
 Germán Busch
 Narciso Campero
 Jorge Córdova
 Hilarión Daza
 Severo Fernández
 Luis García Meza Tejada
 Lidia Gueiler Tejada
 Wálter Guevara
 Néstor Guillén
 José Gutiérrez Guerra
 Felipe Segundo Guzmán
 Enrique Hertzog
 José María Linares
 Mariano Melgarejo
 Carlos Mesa
 Tomás Monje
 Ismael Montes
 Agustín Morales
 Evo Morales
 Alberto Natusch
 Alfredo Ovando Candía
 Gregorio Pacheco
 David Padilla
 José Manuel Pando
 Víctor Paz Estenssoro
 Jaime Paz Zamora
 Juan Pereda
 Enrique Peñaranda
 Carlos Quintanilla
 Jorge Quiroga
 Eduardo Rodríguez
 Bautista Saavedra
 Daniel Salamanca Urey
 Gonzalo Sánchez de Lozada
 Andrés de Santa Cruz
 Hernando Siles Reyes
 Luis Adolfo Siles Salinas
 Hernán Siles Zuazo
 Antonio José de Sucre
 José Luis Tejada Sorzano
 Tomás Frías Ametller
 David Toro
 Celso Torrelio
 Juan José Torres
 Mamerto Urriolagoitía
 Gualberto Villarroel
 Eliodoro Villazón

History of Bolivia
 History of Bolivia
 Gregoria Apaza
 Atacama border dispute
 Hugo Banzer
 Bolivian Gas War
 Bolivian Independence War
 Bolivian Workers' Center
 2004 Bolivian gas referendum
 Bolivian peso
 Bolivian scudo
 Simón Bolívar
 Military career of Simón Bolívar
 Catavi
 Real Audiencia of Charcas
 Cochabamba protests of 2000
 Operation Condor
 Confederación Sindical Única de Trabajadores Campesinos de Bolivia
 Congress of Tucumán
 Federación Sindical de Trabajadores Mineros de Bolivia
 Luis García Meza Tejada
 Guató people
 Revolutionary Nationalist Movement
 Ronald MacLean Abaroa
 Evo Morales
 Alfredo Ovando Candía
 Víctor Paz Estenssoro
 Republic of North Peru
 Republic of South Peru
 Peru-Bolivian Confederation
 Jorge Quiroga
 Manuel Rocha
 Eduardo Rodríguez
 Gonzalo Sánchez de Lozada
 José Mariano Serrano
 Siglo XX mine
 Simón Iturri Patiño
 Bartolina Sisa
 Tiwanaku
 Treaty of Petrópolis
 Tupac Katari
 Túpac Amaru

Members of the 1813 Assembly
 Pedro Ignacio de Castro Barros
 Juan José Paso
 Pedro Ignacio Rivera
 Cayetano José Rodríguez
 Antonio Sáenz
 José Mariano Serrano

Battles of Bolivia
 Battle of Topáter
 Battle of Yungay

Battles of the War of the Pacific
 Battle of Angamos
 Battle of Arica
 Battle of Chipana
 Battle of Huamachuco
 Battle of Iquique
 Battle of Punta Gruesa
 Battle of Pisagua
 Battle of San Francisco
 Battle of Tarapacá
 Battle of Topáter

Battles of the War of the Confederation
 Battle of Yungay

Members of the Congress of Tucumán
(no corresponde a Bolivia, sino an Argentina)
 Manuel Antonio Acevedo
 Tomás de Anchorena
 Pedro Miguel Aráoz
 Mariano Boedo
 José Antonio Cabrera
 Pedro Ignacio de Castro Barros
 José Colombres
 José Darragueira
 Pedro León Gallo
 Esteban Agustín Gazcón
 Tomás Godoy Cruz
 José Ignacio de Gorriti
 Francisco Narciso de Laprida
 José Severo Malabia
 Juan Agustín Maza
 Pedro Medrano
 José Andrés Pacheco de Melo
 Juan José Paso
 Eduardo Pérez Bulnes
 Pedro Ignacio Rivera
 Cayetano José Rodríguez
 Antonio Sáenz
 Gerónimo Salguero de Cabrera y Cabrera
 Teodoro Sánchez de Bustamante
 Mariano Sánchez de Loria
 Justo de Santa María de Oro
 José Mariano Serrano
 José Ignacio Thames
 Pedro Francisco de Uriarte

Elections in Bolivia
 Elections in Bolivia
 2004 Bolivian gas referendum
 2005 Bolivian legislative election
 2005 Bolivian presidential election

Protests in Bolivia
 Bolivian Gas War
 Cochabamba protests of 2000

Wars of Bolivia
 War of the Confederation
 Chaco War
 War of the Pacific

War of the Pacific
 War of the Pacific
 Antofagasta Region
 Arica, Chile
 Atacama border dispute
 BAP Atahualpa
 Biblioteca Nacional del Perú
 Covadonga (ship)
 Ferrocarril de Antofagasta a Bolivia
 Huáscar (ship)
 BAP Manco Cápac
 Tacna
 Tacna-Arica compromise
 Tarapacá Region
 Toro Submarino
 Treaty of Ancón
 USS Lackawanna (1862)

War of the Pacific people
 Eduardo Abaroa
 Francisco Bolognesi
 Manuel Baquedano
 Alberto Blest Gana
 Mariano Bustamante
 Ladislao Cabrera
 Andrés Avelino Cáceres
 Narciso Campero
 Ignacio Carrera Pinto
 Melitón Carvajal
 Hilarión Daza
 Abel-Nicolas Bergasse du Petit-Thouars
 Erasmo Escala
 Miguel Grau Seminario
 Pedro Lagos
 Juan José Latorre
 Patricio Lynch
 Lizardo Montero Flores
 Nicolás de Piérola
 Aníbal Pinto
 Mariano Ignacio Prado
 Arturo Prat
 Roque Sáenz Peña
 Domingo Santa María
 Robert Souper
 Alfonso Ugarte
 Juan Williams Rebolledo

War of the Confederation
 War of the Confederation
 Republic of North Peru
 Republic of South Peru
 Peru-Bolivian Confederation

War of the Confederation people
 José Ballivián
 Manuel Blanco Encalada
 Manuel Bulnes
 Ramón Castilla
 Agustín Gamarra
 Luis José de Orbegoso
 Candelaria Perez
 Diego Portales
 José Joaquín Prieto
 José de la Riva Agüero
 Andrés de Santa Cruz
 Robert Winthrop Simpson

Bolivian law

Crime in Bolivia

Law enforcement in Bolivia
 Law enforcement in Bolivia

Bolivian media
.bo Internet country code top-level domain for Bolivia
 List of Bolivian newspapers
 List of Bolivian magazines
 Media of Bolivia

Newspapers published in Bolivia
 List of Bolivian newspapers

Radio stations in Bolivia

Television stations in Bolivia
 List of Bolivian television channels
 Unitel Bolivia

Military of Bolivia
 Military of Bolivia
 Bolivian Navy
 Juana Azurduy de Padilla

Bolivian people
 Alfredo Da Silva
 Eduardo Abaroa
 Gregoria Apaza
 Luis Arce Gómez
 José Ballivián
 Carlos Quintanilla
 Desiree Durán Morales
 Eugenia Errázuriz
 Jaime Escalante
 Juana Azurduy de Padilla
 Bartolina Sisa
 Franz Tamayo
 Jorge Wilstermann

Bolivian emigrants

Bolivian murder victims

Assassinated Bolivian people

Bolivian people by occupation

Bolivian human rights activists
 Loyola Guzmán

Bolivian lawyers
 Esteban Agustín Gazcón
 José Severo Malabia
 Pedro Ignacio Rivera
 Mariano Sánchez de Loria
 José Mariano Serrano

Bolivian composers
 Jaime Mirtenbaum Zenamon
 Cergio Prudencio

People of Bolivian descent

Bolivian Americans
 Raquel Welch

Bolivian-Chileans
 Andrónico Luksic

Politics of Bolivia
 Politics of Bolivia
 Apu Mallku
 Bolivian Gas War
 Foreign relations of Bolivia
 Liberalism in Bolivia
 Ronald MacLean Abaroa
 National Congress of Bolivia
 Qulla Suyu
 Vice President of Bolivia

Apu Mallku
 Apu Mallku
 Vicente Flores
 Antonio Machaca
 Max Paredes

Bolivian trade unionists
 Felipe Quispe

Political parties in Bolivia
 List of political parties in Bolivia
 Assembly of the Guarani People - North Charagua
 Bolivian Socialist Falange
 Change Charagua
 Christian Democratic Party (Bolivia)
 Civic Solidarity Union
 Communist Party (Marxist-Leninist) of Bolivia
 Communist Party of Bolivia
 Communist Party of Bolivia (Marxist-Leninist)
 Falange Neounzaguista
 Free Bolivia Movement
 Freedom and Justice Party (Bolivia)
 Huanuni for All
 Indigenous Pachakuti Movement
 Movement for Socialism (Bolivia)
 National Unity Front
 Nationalist Democratic Action
 New Republican Force
 Regional Federation of Mining Cooperatives of Huanuni
 Revolutionary Left Movement (Bolivia)
 Revolutionary Left Party (Bolivia)
 Revolutionary Liberation Movement Tupaq Katari
 Revolutionary Nationalist Movement
 Revolutionary Party of the Nationalist Left
 Revolutionary Workers' Party (Bolivia)
 Social Unity Uprising of September First
 Social and Democratic Power
 Socialist Aymara Group
 Socialist Party (Bolivia)
 Unidad Democratica y Popular
 Unified Trade Union Sub Federation of Peasant Workers of Ancoraimes - Tupak Katari
 Without Fear Movement
 Yungas Cocalera Revolution

Bolivian politicians
 David Choquehuanca
 Víctor Hugo Cárdenas
 Eduardo Diez de Medina
 Federico Diez de Medina
 Samuel Jorge Doria Medina Auza
 Álvaro García Linera
 Adriana Gil
 Armando Loaiza
 Antonio Machaca
 Víctor Paz Estenssoro
 Felipe Quispe
 Casimira Rodriguez

Assassinated Bolivian politicians
 Manuel Isidoro Belzu
 Hilarión Daza
 Juan José Torres

Bolivian society
 Asociación de Scouts de Bolivia
 CIDOB Confederation
 Demographics of Bolivia
 Public holidays in Bolivia

Sport in Bolivia

Football in Bolivia
 Bolivia national football team
 Federación Boliviana de Fútbol
 Liga de Fútbol Profesional Boliviano

Bolivian football clubs
 Club Aurora
 Club Blooming
 Club Bolívar
 Club Universitario
 Club Destroyers
 Oriente Petrolero
 Club Bamin Real Potosí
 Club San José
 The Strongest
 Union Central (football club)
 Club Jorge Wilstermann

Bolivian footballers
 Carlos Borja (Bolivian footballer)
 Joaquín Botero
 Ramiro Castillo
 Luis Cristaldo
 Marco Etcheverry
 José Melgar
 Jaime Moreno
 Álvaro Peña
 Juan Manuel Peña
 Gustavo Quinteros
 Luis Ramallo
 Mauricio Ramos
 Miguel Rimba
 Erwin Sánchez
 Marco Sandy
 Víctor Ugarte
 Joselito Vaca
 Diego Hamada

Bolivia at the Olympics
 Bolivia at the 1936 Summer Olympics
 Bolivia at the 1964 Summer Olympics
 Bolivia at the 1968 Summer Olympics
 Bolivia at the 1972 Summer Olympics
 Bolivia at the 1976 Summer Olympics
 Bolivia at the 1984 Summer Olympics
 Bolivia at the 1988 Summer Olympics
 Bolivia at the 1992 Summer Olympics
 Bolivia at the 1996 Summer Olympics
 Bolivia at the 2000 Summer Olympics
 Bolivia at the 2004 Summer Olympics

Bolivian sportspeople

Bolivian football managers
 Gustavo Quinteros
 Erwin Sánchez

Olympic competitors for Bolivia
 Diego Camacho

Bolivian racecar drivers

Bolivian rally drivers
 William Bendeck

Bolivian tennis players
 Diego Camacho

Transportation in Bolivia
 Transportation in Bolivia

Airlines of Bolivia
 List of airlines of Bolivia
 Aerosur
 TAM - Transporte Aéreo Militar

Roads in Bolivia
 Yungas Road

Water transport in Bolivia

Bolivia stubs
 Adolfo Ballivián
 Agustín Morales
 Alberto Natusch
 Alcides Arguedas
 Aniceto Arce
 Assembly of the Guarani People - North Charagua
 Ayllus
 Bartolina Sisa
 Battle of Pisagua
 Battle of San Francisco
 Battle of Topáter
 Bautista Saavedra
 Bolivia at the 1936 Summer Olympics
 Bolivia at the 1964 Summer Olympics
 Bolivia at the 1968 Summer Olympics
 Bolivia at the 1972 Summer Olympics
 Bolivia at the 1976 Summer Olympics
 Bolivia at the 1984 Summer Olympics
 Bolivia at the 1988 Summer Olympics
 Bolivia at the 1992 Summer Olympics
 Bolivia at the 1996 Summer Olympics
 Bolivia at the 2000 Summer Olympics
 Bolivian Workers' Center
 Camiri
 Carlos Blanco Galindo
 Carlos Borja (Bolivian footballer)
 Carlos Quintanilla
 Celso Torrelio
 Change Charagua
 Charcas (Audiencia)
 Christian Democratic Party (Bolivia)
 Civic Solidarity Union
 Cocalero
 Cochabamba Cooperative School
 Communist Party (Marxist-Leninist) of Bolivia
 Confederación Sindical Única de Trabajadores Campesinos de Bolivia
 David Padilla
 David Toro
 Desiree Durán Morales
 Eduardo Abaroa
 Eduardo Rodríguez
 Ekeko
 El Diario
 Eliodoro Camacho
 Eliodoro Villazón
 Enrique Hertzog
 Enrique Peñaranda
 Erwin Sánchez
 Estadio Félix Capriles
 Estadio Hernando Siles
 Estadio IV Centenário
 Estadio Jesús Bermúdez
 Estadio Libertador Simón Bolivar
 Estadio Mario Mercado Vaca Guzmán
 Estadio Olímpico Patria
 Estadio Rafael Mendoza
 Estadio Ramón Tahuichi Aguilera
 Falange Neounzaguista
 Felipe Segundo Guzmán
 Franz Tamayo
 Free Bolivia Movement
 Germán Busch
 Gregoria Apaza
 Gregorio Pacheco
 Guido Vildoso
 Guillermo Lora
 Gustavo Quinteros
 Hernando Siles Reyes
 Hilarión Daza
 Huanuni for All
 Hugo Ballivián
 Indigenous Pachakuti Movement
 Islam in Bolivia
 Ismael Montes
 Jorge Córdova
 Jorge Quiroga
 José Ballivián
 José Gutiérrez Guerra
 José Manuel Pando
 José María Achá
 José María Linares
 José Melgar
 Juan Manuel Peña
 Khanata
 Lidia Gueiler Tejada
 Luis Adolfo Siles Salinas
 Luis Arce Gómez
 Luis Cristaldo
 Luis García Meza Tejada
 Luis Ramallo
 Mamerto Urriolagoitia
 Manuel Isidoro Belzu
 Marcelo Quiroga Santa Cruz
 Marco Sandy
 Mariano Baptista
 Mariano Melgarejo
 Matilde Casazola
 Mauricio Ramos
 Miguel Rimba
 Movement for Socialism (Bolivia)
 Narciso Campero
 National Unity Front
 Nationalist Democratic Action
 New Republican Force
 Northeast Bolivian Airways
 Néstor Guillén
 Freedom and Justice Party (Bolivia)
 Pedro Shimose
 Ramiro Castillo
 Regional Federation of Mining Cooperatives of Huanuni
 Revolutionary Left Movement (Bolivia)
 Revolutionary Liberation Movement Tupaq Katari
 Samuel Jorge Doria Medina Auza
 San Agustin High School
 Severo Fernández
 Social Unity Uprising of September First
 Social and Democratic Power
 Socialist Aymara Group
 Socialist Party (Bolivia)
 TAM - Transporte Aéreo Militar
 Template:Bolivia-stub
 The Women's Development Bank
 Toba (tribe)
 Tomás Frías Ametller
 Tomás Monje
 Unidad Democratica y Popular
 Unified Trade Union Sub Federation of Peasant Workers of Ancoraimes - Tupak Katari
 Unitel Bolivia
 Universidad Adventista de Bolivia
 Víctor Hugo Cárdenas
 Víctor Ugarte
 Without Fear Movement
 Wálter Guevara
 YPFB
 Yungas Cocalera Revolution
 Álvaro García Linera
 Álvaro Peña

Other
 
 Hiking in Bolivia
 Communications in Bolivia
 Economic history of Bolivia
 Education in Bolivia
 Elections in Bolivia
 Foreign relations of Bolivia
 Human rights in Bolivia
 ISO 3166-2:BO
 Law of Bolivia
 List of Bolivia companies
 List of Bolivian television channels
 List of Bolivians
 Transport in Bolivia
 United Nations
 Water supply and sanitation in Bolivia

See also

Index of Bolivia-related articles
List of international rankings
Lists of country-related topics
Outline of geography
Outline of South America
United Nations

External links

 
Outlines of countries
Wikipedia outlines